The men's K-2 1000 metres event was a pairs kayaking event conducted as part of the Canoeing at the 1968 Summer Olympics program. In the official report, heats were shown timed in tenths of a second (0.1) while the rest of the events were shown timed in hundredths of a second (0.01).

Medalists

Results

Heats
The 20 crews first raced in three heats on October 22. The top three finishers from each of the heats advanced directly to the semifinals. Three were eliminated to not starting and the remaining eight teams were relegated to the repechage heats.

Repechages
Taking place on October 23, the top three competitors in each of the two repechages advanced to the semifinals.

Semifinals
The top three finishers in each of the three semifinals (raced on October 24) advanced to the final.

Final
The final was held on October 25.

References
1968 Summer Olympics official report Volume 3, Part 2. pp. 617–8. 
Sports-reference.com 1968 K-2 1000 m results.

Men's K-2 1000
Men's events at the 1968 Summer Olympics